Charles Clough may refer to:

 Charles Clough (artist) (born 1951), American painter
 Charles Clough (geologist) (1852–1916), British geologist and mapmaker
 Charles F. Clough (1843–1927), American politician, mayor of Spokane from 1890 to 1891